Pennsylvania's state elections were held November 7, 2000. Necessary primary elections were held on April 4, 2000.

President

Senator

Attorney general

Auditor General

State Treasurer

Pennsylvania State Senate

Pennsylvania House of Representatives

References

 
Pennsylvania